James Challen (4 October 1825 – 1900) was an English cricketer.  Challen's batting and bowling styles are unknown.  He was born at Kirdford, Sussex.

Challen made his first-class debut for Sussex against Kent in 1848.  He made eighteen further first-class appearances for the county, the last of which came against Kent in 1857.  In his nineteen first-class appearances for Sussex, he took 23 wickets at an average of 14.75, with the most wickets he took in a single innings standing at 4.  Due to incomplete records, his exact best figures are unknown.  Challen played as a bowler, as such he had little success with the bat.  He scored a total of 323 runs for Sussex, which came at a batting average of 9.22, with a high score of 37.  Challen also made a single first-class appearance each for the Players against the Gentlemen in 1854, and for England against the Marylebone Cricket Club in the same year.

He died somewhere in Sussex in 1900.  His father, James Challen senior, played first-class cricket for Sussex.

References

External links
James Challen at ESPNcricinfo
James Challen at CricketArchive

1825 births
1900 deaths
People from Kirdford
English cricketers
Sussex cricketers
Players cricketers